Elections to Stockport Metropolitan Borough Council were held on 1 May 2003. One third of the council was up for election. The council remained in no overall control and this was the last Stockport local elections before the ward boundary changes came into effect for the 2004 local elections.

Ward Results

Bramhall East Ward

Bramhall West Ward

Bredbury Ward

Brinnington Ward

Cale Green Ward

Cheadle Ward

Cheadle Hulme North Ward

Cheadle Hulme South Ward

Davenport Ward

Edgeley Ward

Great Moor Ward

Hazel Grove Ward

Heald Green Ward

Heaton Mersey Ward

Heaton Moor Ward

Manor Ward

Marple North Ward

Marple South and High Lane Ward

Reddish North Ward

Reddish South Ward

Romiley Ward

References

Stockport Metropolitan Borough Council elections
2003 English local elections